Mambaye Coulibaly (1957–2015) was a Malian film director, who pioneered animation in African cinema.

Life
Mambaye Coulibaly was born on 2 May 1957 in Kayes. After studying law, he turned to film in 1987. La Geste de Ségou! (1989), for which Coulibaly also wrote the music, was an animated short film inspired by historical events in the Bambara Empire of Ségou. The Ivorian playwright Werewere Liking designed puppets for the film.

In 1996 Coulibaly started working on a feature-length animation project, Le Pouvoir de Ségou, a project relaunched in 2009 as part of the Euromédiatoon project. Unfortunately long-term illness prevented the film's completion. Coulibaly died on 7 February 2015 at Kayes.

Films
 La Geste de Ségou!, 1989

References

External links
 

1957 births
2015 deaths
Malian film directors
Animated film directors
People from Kayes
21st-century Malian people